This article lists the oldest extant buildings in California, including extant buildings and structures constructed during Spanish, Mexican, and early American rule over California. Only buildings built prior to 1850 are suitable for inclusion on this list, or the building must be the oldest of its type.

In order to qualify for the list, a structure must:
 be a recognizable building (defined as any human-made structure used or intended for supporting or sheltering any use or continuous occupancy);
 incorporate features of building work from the claimed date to at least  in height and/or be a listed building.

This consciously excludes ruins of limited height, roads and statues. Bridges may be included if they otherwise fulfill the above criteria. Dates for many of the oldest structures have been arrived at by radiocarbon dating and should be considered approximate. If the exact year of initial construction is estimated, it will be shown as a range of dates.

18th century

19th century

20th century

See also
National Register of Historic Places listings in California
Spanish missions in California
History of California
Oldest buildings in the United States

References

External links

California
Architecture in California
Oldest